The 1919 Prince Edward Island general election was held in the Canadian province of Prince Edward Island on July 24, 1919.

The opposition Liberals led by John Howatt Bell gained eleven seats to defeat the incumbent government of Conservative Premier Aubin E. Arsenault, who had succeeded former Premier John A. Mathieson in 1917.

John A. Dewar, a former Conservative member, was elected as an Independent Assembleyman for 3rd Kings.

Party Standings

Members Elected

The Legislature of Prince Edward Island had two levels of membership from 1893 to 1996 - Assemblymen and Councillors. This was a holdover from when the Island had a bicameral legislature, the General Assembly and the Legislative Council.

In 1893, the Legislative Council was abolished and had its membership merged with the Assembly, though the two titles remained separate and were elected by different electoral franchises. Assembly men were elected by all eligible voters of within a district, while Councillors were only elected by landowners within a district.

Kings

Queens

Prince

Sources

Further reading
 

1919 elections in Canada
Elections in Prince Edward Island
1919 in Prince Edward Island
July 1919 events